Ellice Hopkins (30 October 1836 – 21 August 1904) was a Victorian social campaigner and author. Hopkins co-founded the White Cross Army in 1883, and vigorously advocated moral purity while criticising contemporary sexual double standards.

Early life 
Jane Ellice Hopkins was born in Cambridge, the daughter of William Hopkins, a mathematics tutor at the University of Cambridge, and his second wife, Caroline Frances Boys Hopkins. As a girl, Hopkins knew the photographer Julia Margaret Cameron. At age 30, after her father's death, Hopkins moved to Brighton with her mother.

Activism 
In 1874 Hopkins and rescue worker Sarah Robinson established the Soldier's Institute at Portsmouth, and in 1876 toured several British towns, recruiting thousands of women to the Ladies' Association for the Care of Friendless Girls. Her biographer describes her as "instrumental" in the passing of the Industrial Schools Amendment Act of 1880, which allowed children to be removed from hazardous homes (including brothels) and placed in industrial schools. She also lobbied for the Criminal Law Amendment Act of 1885, which raised the female age of consent from 13 to 16, and criminalised male homosexuality. Hopkins co-founded the White Cross Army, a men's Christian organization, in 1883 with Bishop J. B. Lightfoot of Durham. "It was hard that the power which would have been a glory to me if I were a man, should be held a shame and a disgrace to me because I was a woman," she recalled of her work.

Writing 
Hopkins wrote in a wide variety of genres, including two volumes of poetry, English Idylls (1865) and Autumn Swallows (1883), and a sensational gothic novel, Rose Turquand (1874). An Englishwoman's Work Among Workingmen (1875) was a memoir of her activism. She wrote pamphlets, most notably True Manliness (1883), and Christian devotional works, including Christ the Consoler, A Book of Comfort for the Sick (1879), and A plea for the wider action of the Church of England in the prevention of the degradation of women, an essay in which she criticised the contemporary double standard by which women were disproportionately blamed for sexual immorality. Her last books were The Power of Womanhood (1899), on the role of mothers in "moral evolution", and The Story of Life (1902), a guide intended to help parents teach sex education to their adolescent children.

Personal life 
Multiple chronic health issues led Hopkins to withdraw from public life in 1888. She died in 1904, aged 67 years, in Brighton. Fellow activist Rosa Mary Barrett wrote a short biography of Hopkins, published in 1907.

References

Further reading 

 Morgan, Sue. A passion for purity : Ellice Hopkins and the politics of gender in the late-Victorian church (Bristol, 1999).
 Morgan, Sue. "Faith, sex and purity: the religio-feminist theory of Ellice Hopkins", Women's History Review, 9 (2000), p. 13.
 Mumm, Susan. "'I love my sex' : two late Victorian pulpit women", in Perry, Gill; Laurence, Anne; Bellamy, Joan (eds) Women, scholarship and criticism : gender and knowledge, c.1790–1900 (Manchester, 2000), pp. 204–21.

External links 
 
 
 Archival Sources indexed by The National Archives

1836 births
1904 deaths
19th-century English women writers
English feminists
English social justice activists
English women poets
English women novelists
People from Cambridge